Krzysztof Kaniecki is a retired Polish long jumper.

He finished fourteenth at the 1988 European Indoor Championships. He became Polish indoor champion in the same year.

References

Year of birth missing (living people)
Living people
Polish male long jumpers
Place of birth missing (living people)